Roberto Huerta (7 April 1917 – 17 January 2003) was de facto Federal Interventor of Córdoba, Argentina from July 5, 1969 to April 9, 1970.

References

1917 births
2003 deaths
Governors of Córdoba Province, Argentina
People from Lomas de Zamora